Silver Hill is an unincorporated community and census-designated place (CDP) in Prince George's County, Maryland, United States, approximately  southeast of Washington, D.C. Per the 2020 census, the population was 6,381. Prior to 2010, Silver Hill was part of the Suitland-Silver Hill census-designated place.

Geography

Demographics

2020 census

Note: the US Census treats Hispanic/Latino as an ethnic category. This table excludes Latinos from the racial categories and assigns them to a separate category. Hispanics/Latinos can be of any race.

Education
Silver Hill is served by the county-wide public school system, Prince George's County Public Schools.

Portions are zoned to Panorama, Suitland, Hillcrest Heights, and William Beanes elementary schools.

Portions are zoned to Benjamin Stoddert Middle School, Thurgood Marshall Middle School, and Drew-Freeman Middle School.

Portions are zoned to Potomac High School, Suitland High School, and Crossland High School.

References

Census-designated places in Maryland
Census-designated places in Prince George's County, Maryland